General intellect, according to Karl Marx in his Grundrisse, became a crucial  force of production. It is a combination of technological expertise and social intellect, or general social knowledge (increasing importance of machinery in social organization). The "general intellect" passage in the 'Fragment on machines' section of Grundrisse, says that, while the development of machinery led to the oppression of workers under capitalism, it also offers a prospect for future liberation.

Overview

According to Marx, the development of the general intellect manifests in a capitalist society, in the control of the social life process. In other words, with the idea of the general intellect, Marx designates a radical change of the subsumption of labour to capital and indicates a third stage of the division of labour. The concept has several interpretations. For instance, Paolo Virno maintained that "general intellect" does not only thrive in communism, as Marx originally thought, since it also characterized other economic systems such as the late capitalism. Here, it is suggested that Marx underestimated the extent to which the general intellect would develop within capitalism, particularly in the modern period where the concept is said to have been realised but with no revolutionary or even conflictual repercussions.

Etymology

According to Matteo Pasquinelli, Marx took the expression 'general intellect' from William Thompson's book An Inquiry Into the Principles of the Distribution of Wealth (1824) which is probably the first book ever written on mental labour. According to Pasquinelli the concept disappears in the transition between the Grundrisse and Capital as it is replaced by the notion of collective worker or Gesamtarbeiter.

See also 
Cognitive capitalism

References

External links 
 Paolo Virno, "General Intellect" in Lessico Postfordista, Milano: Feltrinelli, 2001.
 Matteo Pasquinelli, "Italian Operaismo and the Information Machine", Theory, Culture & Society, first published on February 2, 2014.
Matteo Pasquinelli, "On the Origins of Marx's General Intellect". Radical Philosophy, 2.06, winter 2019. 
 Tony Smith. The "General Intellect" in the Grundrisse and beyond. 

Marxist theory